The ASJA Viking II was a four-seat light aircraft built in Sweden in the early 1930s.  It was a development of the Viking, a high-wing braced cabin monoplane of taildragger configuration.  It was available with either wheeled or float undercarriage.

Specifications

References

See also

1930s Swedish civil utility aircraft
High-wing aircraft
Viking II
Single-engined tractor aircraft
Floatplanes